Aleksandr  Solodkov (born 2 July  1998) is a Russian football player.

Club career
He made his debut in the Russian Professional Football League for FC Tekstilshchik Ivanovo on 19 July 2017 in a game against FC Chertanovo Moscow. He made his Russian Football National League debut for Tekstilshchik  on 8 September 2019 in a game against FC Baltika Kaliningrad.

References

External links
 
 
 Profile by Russian Professional Football League

1998 births
Living people
Russian footballers
Association football midfielders
FC Tekstilshchik Ivanovo players
Sportspeople from Vologda Oblast